Herniosina is a genus of flies belonging to the family Lesser Dung flies.

Species
H. bequaerti (Villeneuve, 1917)
H. calabra Roháček, 2021
H. erymantha Roháček, 2016
H. hamata Roháček, 2016
H. horrida (Roháček, 1978)
H. pollex Roháček, 1993
H. voluminosa Marshall, 1987

References

Sphaeroceridae
Diptera of North America
Diptera of Europe
Brachycera genera